A Modern Magdalen is a 1915 American drama, 5-reel silent black and white film directed by Will S. Davis and based on the 1902 play by C. Haddon Chambers.  The film was produced and released by the Life Photo Film Corporation in their studios in Grantwood, New Jersey.

Cast
 Cathrine Countiss as Katinka Jenkins
 Lionel Barrymore as Lindsay
 William H. Tooker as Joe Mercer
 Charles E. Graham as Katinka's father
 Marjorie Nelson as Olivia Jenkins

References

External links
 
 A Modern Magdalen at American Film Institute
Photographic still of Cathrine Countiss and Lionel Barrymore..(earlyirishcinema website and Media History Digital Library)

Silent American drama films
1915 drama films
1915 films
American black-and-white films
Films directed by Will S. Davis
American films based on plays
1910s American films